Aerosud is a group of companies with Aerosud Holdings as the parent company. The group is a South African aeronautical engineering and manufacturing company. Aerosud Aerospace was renamed Paramount Aerospace following its acquisition by Paramount Group and Aerosud Innovation and Training Centre (ITC) was incorporated in the AHRLAC Holdings Ahrlac of companies during a 2014 restructuring.

History
Aerosud was formed during 1990 by a number of former employees of the Atlas Aircraft Corporation, including several key designers of Denel Rooivalk attack helicopter and similar leading engineers involved in the Atlas Cheetah fighter program (A locally-developed upgrade of the Dassault Mirage III fighter). One designer Paul Potgieter, became the company's managing director. The entity initially focused itself on the aeromechanical sector. Aerosud's early years of operation were marked by a feud between itself and Atlas, which was only resolved over a decade later.

The company's first major contract involved the re-engining of the Dassault Mirage F1 with the Soviet-sourced Klimov RD-33 engine most commonly used to power the Mikoyan MiG-29 fighter. This project was intended to demonstrate a viable upgrade path for Mirage F1 operators, particularly South African Air Force (SAAF). The South African government ultimately decided to acquire the Swedish Saab JAS 39 Gripen; despite this, the fighter was a technical success and has been used for decades by Aerosud as a company demonstrator. The programme was also viewed as a useful primer for future international collaboration.

During the mid-1990s, Aerosud embarked on a diversification into the commercial aviation market, becoming involved in the design of galleys and other interior systems. Aerosud since became an internationally recognised supplier for interior systems.

Around 2000, Aerosud embarked upon major expansion of its production capacity. From the company's premises outside of Pretoria, South Africa, it manufactures around 2,000 parts and assemblies per day and supplies these to the assembly lines of various international aerospace manufacturers, including Airbus, Boeing, BAE Systems, and AgustaWestland. Under a 15-year strategic partnership deal with Boeing, Aerosud constructed a new manufacturing plant near Pretoria to build cabin elements, having been appointed the sole supplier of interior composites and thermoplastic frames across Boeing's range.

By 2006, the firm has become deeply involved in numerous civilian and military aviation engineering projects, covering aspects such as design, development, prototyping, manufacture and in service support. That same year, Aerosud was appointed to perform both the design and manufacture of interior elements of the Airbus A400M Atlas. The firm's involvement in the programme continued even following the SAAF's decision to cancel its A400M order. Two years prior, the company had become involved as a subcontractor in the Airbus A320 family, manufacturing elements such leading edge wing components and the avionics bay subassemblies.

During late 2009, Aerosud commenced work on the upgrading of the SAAF's fleet of Pilatus PC-9 trainer aircraft, installing a glass cockpit and a modern avionics suite, as well as removing obsolete equipment. That same year, the South African defense company Paramount Group purchased a 19% stake in Aerosud.

During the 2010s, the company became involved in the AHRLAC Holdings Ahrlac, a light attack and reconnaissance aircraft; it was originally being developed as a joint venture with Paramount Group.

Aerosud restructured in 2014 with the Industrial Development Corporation (IDC) taking up 25% shareholding in Aerosud Holdings and some of the founding members exciting the company partially or completely. Aerosud Aerospace was sold to Paramount Group and subsequently renamed as Paramount Aerospace, whilst Aerosud Innovation and Training Centre (ITC) that housed the development of the AHRLAC aircraft was spun out in a separate group owned at the time by the Potgieter and Itchikowitz families. Following the restructuring Aerosud focused solely on commercial aerospace activities.

During September 2014, a three-party collaborative agreement was signed by Denel Aerostructures, Aerosud and Airbus to create a 10-year investment plan for the development of more sophisticated manufacturing techniques; the agreement was viewed as a step towards a greater presence on the competitive global supply chain of Airbus and other original equipment manufacturers. With the demise of Denel Aerostructures and the chronic financial troubles South African Airways (as an off-take catalyst for Airbus) finds itself in this agreement never developed its potential.

Since 2014 Aerosud expressed its interest in adding structural composites as a new offering. It acquired a patented and innovative tooling and production technology, Cellular Core Technology (CCT) that allows the production of complex shaped, multi cell structural composites in a single curing process. The technology allows for highly optimized designs (weight reduction) and reduced labour cost with a lot of assembly work eliminated. Although the technical community at OEMs showed a lot of enthusiasm for CCT only prototype\demonstrator components have been successfully launched.

References

External links
 Official homepage
 Cipro listing

Manufacturing companies established in 1990
Aircraft manufacturers of South Africa
Manufacturing companies based in the City of Tshwane
Organisations based in Pretoria
1990 establishments in South Africa